Euphemia II, Countess of Ross (also Euphemia Leslie) was the daughter of Alexander Leslie, Earl of Ross and his wife Isabella Stewart, daughter of Robert Stewart, 1st Duke of Albany. She was the only child and heir of Earl Alexander, and succeeded to the earldom de jure upon his death in 1402.

She became a ward of her grandfather Albany, and never seems to have exercised much power in the province of Ross. There was a failed attempt to marry her to Thomas Dunbar, the son of Thomas Dunbar, Earl of Moray. Governor Albany persuaded her to resign the earldom to his own second son, John Stewart, Earl of Buchan. This action was challenged by Domhnall of Islay, Lord of the Isles, who claimed the earldom on behalf of his wife Mariota and who became an enemy of the Albany Stewarts.

Euphemia thereafter disappears from the record, retiring to the nunnery of North Berwick. Some of the histories report that she was deformed, seemingly a hunchback.

References

 
 
 Paul, James Balfour, The Scots Peerage, Vol. VII, (Edinburgh, 1910)

Leslie, Euphemia
Leslie, Euphemia
Leslie, Euphemia
Leslie, Euphemia
Leslie, Euphemia
Leslie, Euphemia
15th-century Scottish peers
15th-century Scottish women
15th-century Christians